Arangetram (in Tamil and in Malayalam, known as "Rangapravesha" in Kannada and "Rangapravesham" in Telugu) is the debut on-stage performance of a former student of Indian classical dance and music that follows years of training in classical music and dancing. Many Indian classical dance forms require their followers to perform an arangetram. Once a student has done so, they are thereafter allowed to perform dances on their own and to teach aspiring dancers.

Etymology
Arangetram is a portmanteau of the Tamil words for stage ("arangu") and ascent ("etram") and its literal translation is "climbing or ascending the stage". In the context of dance, the word refers to the graduation ceremony in which the guru presents his or her pupil to the public. Its origins can be traced to the devdasi (temple dancer) tradition. Arangetram can be performed for other Indian classical dance styles such as Kathak, Kuchipudi, Manipuri, Kathakali, Bharatanatyam, and Mohiniattam as well as vocal and instrument recitals like Mridangam, ghatam, and violin.

References

 Arangetram (dance debut) in Bharathanatyam: a rite of passage for the court and temple dancers of India, by Hira Harish Panth. State University of New York at Stony Brook, 1993.

External links
 Planning an Arangetram
How to create & send Arangetram Video Invitations with RSVP

Bharatanatyam